Vegard Sverre Tveitan (born 10 October 1975), better known by his stage name Ihsahn, is a Norwegian multi-instrumentalist, vocalist and composer, best known for his work with black metal band Emperor. Tveitan is also a founding member of Thou Shalt Suffer, where he played guitar and keyboard in addition to vocal duties, and Peccatum, a project in collaboration with his wife and fellow musician Heidi Solberg Tveitan, also known as Starofash. Since 2006, Tveitan has primarily devoted himself to solo albums and occasional guest appearances.

Beyond the characteristics typically associated with metal music, Tveitan's musical style also includes classical, industrial, and progressive elements. He is a progenitor of the symphonic black metal genre. Emperor's final album, Prometheus: The Discipline of Fire & Demise, composed by Ihsahn, epitomizes the genre.

Biography 
Tveitan was born in Notodden, Norway, where he grew up on a large rural farm. He began playing piano at age six and guitar at age 10.

Early years: Xerasia, Embryonic, and Thou Shalt Suffer 
At the age of 13, Tveitan met Tomas Haugen (also known as Samoth), who would become his long time collaborator and the co-founder of Emperor. While at a music seminar, Tveitan gained Haugen's attention with his Iron Maiden patches.

In 1990 Tveitan joined Haugen's band Xerasia, a death metal band in which he played guitar and keyboards. They eventually changed their name to Embryonic sometime that year. In November, the band released a self-financed four-track demo titled The Land of the Lost Souls. In 1991 they changed their name again to Thou Shalt Suffer. The project was partially funded by a government grant and the group made several releases in 1990 and 1991. Shortly after, Haugen left the band to focus on other projects. Tveitan later used the name Thou Shalt Suffer to release an album of electronic music that he composed entitled Somnium.

Formation of Emperor and Peccatum 
Later in 1991 Haugen and Tveitan formed Emperor. Emperor had a much more refined black metal sound which showcased Tveitan's developing keyboard skills, a distinct feature that would appear in many of his later releases. The band at this time received a lot of support and encouragement from black metal pioneer Euronymous, and after several demos, the Emperor EP was released in 1993 to much acclaim.

During this time, bandmates Bård Eithun (also known as Faust) and Haugen were imprisoned; Eithun for murder and Haugen for arson. Tveitan retreated to a property owned by his family to compose much of what would later become Anthems to the Welkin at Dusk, which was recorded after Haugen's parole.

In 1995 the cult album Blood Must be Shed, by Zyklon-B was released featuring members of Emperor and Satyricon. Tveitan played synth on the album. In 1998 Tveitan and his wife Heidi Solberg Tveitan—who at the time used the stage name Ihriel—formed the experimental band Peccatum. Tveitan offered his iconic synth sound as well as clean and black vocals to the project. Peccatum would eventually becoming his main project until its termination on 4 March 2006.

In 1999 Emperor released IX Equilibrium, Tveitan's third studio album with the group. Two years later, in 2001, Peccatum released their second studio album, Amor Fati. In the same year, Emperor released their fourth and final studio album, Prometheus: The Discipline of Fire & Demise. 'Prometheus' was entirely composed by Tveitan and featured more complex orchestration than previous works; though significantly less synthesizers than before. It was at this time that Emperor mutually decided to dissolve, leaving Tveitan and his bandmates with more time to focus on their various side projects.

2004 saw the release of Peccatum's third and final studio album, Lost in Reverie, with an EP titled The Moribund People following the year after. On 30 September 2005, Emperor made a surprise return at Scream magazine's 15-year anniversary party at Rockefeller Music Hall in Oslo. The show was kept top secret, only known by a handful of people. The band played three songs. This was to announce the reuniting of the band for a few shows around Europe and America in 2006, namely at Wacken and Inferno Festival.

Solo albums

2006–2010: The Adversary, angL, and After 

In April 2006, Tveitan released his first solo album, The Adversary. He recorded and produced the album by himself, with the exception of drums which were contributed by Asgeir Mickelson, and guest vocals on the track "Homecoming" by Kristoffer Rygg of Ulver. The album showcases his progressive influences as well as heavy metal, black metal and classical music. The Adversary was recorded at Symphonique Studios in Norway and was released on his label Mnemosyne Productions, which he founded in 2003 with Starofash. A video was made for the opening track, "Invocation".

He released his second studio album, titled angL, the following year, featuring Lars K. Norberg on bass, Asgeir Mickelson on drums, and guest vocals from Mikael Åkerfeldt (of Opeth) on the track "Unhealer".

In March 2009, Tveitan performed some of his solo material live for the first time, in a one-off performance opening for Opeth in Norway. He has since made many festival appearances, playing a mix of solo material and Emperor covers. Fellow Norwegians Leprous have served as his backing band. Grimen, the only album by side project 'Hardingrock' was released the same year.

Tveitan released his third solo album, After, in January 2010. Lars K. Nordberg and Asgeir Mickelson once again contributed bass and drums, respectively, with Jørgen Munkeby (of Shining) playing saxophone on several tracks as well. Later that year, in October, a Mnemosyne web update confirmed that Ihsahn had already begun writing for a fourth solo album, and was also focusing on upgrading his studio at home.

2011–2013: Bilateral, Eremita, and Das Seelenbrechen 
2011 was a busy year for Tveitan. Aside from making his solo debut in the US at the annual ProgPower USA metal festival in Atlanta, Georgia, he also performed as a guest on two records, co-produced the album Bilateral with his wife, and continued to work on his fourth solo album. Collaborators once again included Jørgen Munkeby and Devin Townsend, who in a November 2011 interview mentioned that he was "singing a song for Ihsahn's new thing", but added that he could not elaborate any more at that point in time.

In 2012, Tveitan released his fourth studio solo album, Eremita.

Das Seelenbrechen was released on 21 October 2013. It was recorded in Juke Joint Studio and Tveitan's own Mnemosyne Studio.

2016–2018: Arktis and Àmr 
In April 2016, Tveitan released his sixth studio album, Arktis, on Candlelight Records. The album was mixed and mastered by Jens Bogren. The album cover features a photograph of Fridtjof Nansen, whose 1896 mission to the North Pole fits with the lyrical atmosphere of the album. They also share their birthday of 10 October.

In 2018, Tveitan released Àmr, his seventh studio album. The title of the album is an old Norse word for "loathsome" or "black" and reflects the introspective nature of the songs. Tveitan added that the word Àmr, could also mean "rust red" and that the concept of a "room without walls" was a prevalent metaphor when working on the album. In comparison to previous albums, Àmr also features a greater use of electronic sounds, including analog synthesizers, that add to the intimate feeling of the music.

Awards and publications 
In 2002, Tveitan was awarded the Notodden kommunes kulturpris (Notodden Municipality's Culture prize). He won the prize because he is considered the best-known inhabitant of Notodden, a great musician, a music teacher, and he arranges a lot of concerts for unknown bands. The fact that his band sold more than 500,000 copies was also a reason for getting the prize.

Tveitan has instructional videos on playing guitar that have appeared in online publications such as Guitar World.

Tveitan's third solo album, After, was nominated for a Norwegian Grammy, a Spellemannprisen.

Tveitan lent his voice in 2007 to an animated character from the Adult Swim cartoon Metalocalypse, Eric von Wiechlinghammer, in the episode "Dethfashion".

Musical style and influences 
In an interview in 2012, Tveitan cited Iron Maiden, King Diamond, Judas Priest, and Pink Floyd as influential artists when he was young. He highlighted the conceptual and narrative aspects that these groups constructed their albums around as being particularly influential. His solo albums also strive to maintain a cohesive thread throughout. Tveitan has described planning the atmosphere and conceptual underpinnings of Arktis and Àmr before beginning the compositional process, and has rejected the idea that albums are mere collections of songs.

Personal life 
Ihsahn is married to Heidi Solberg Tveitan, known professionally as Starofash or Ihriel. He has cited her as an important creative collaborator on his solo albums. Tveitan is the brother-in-law of Einar Solberg, the lead vocalist of the band Leprous, Kenneth Solberg, former guitarist of the band Leprous, and Lord PZ, who was a part of the band Peccatum together with both Ihsahn and his wife.

Ihsahn has a son named Angell Solberg Tveitan. He appears on the album Ámr on track 5.

Beliefs
Ihsahn described himself a Satanist in the 1990s. As he explained in 1994, he considered Satanism to be hard to define, as there are different ways of Satanism, and to be more of a category the individual would have to set for themselves. He considered most other adolescents to be "soulless" people, too involved in materialistic things. He said the imprisonment of the other Emperor members had both positive and negative effects; it meant a difficult period for the band, but the imprisonment also gave them publicity and therefore more possibilities to spread their ideas. Ihsahn additionally has said he has seen no reason to be physically destructive and has had no personal connection to the church burning cases that rocked Norway. In a 1994 interview, Ihsahn described a social Darwinist influence on his Satanism, calling himself anti-Christian and saying it is "not for a weak person", while also expressing respect towards European paganism, meditation and stewardship of the environment. He has additionally condemned acts of criminality and other forms of religious intolerance such as the aforementioned arson cases.

Band

 Current members
 Ihsahn – guitars, bass guitar, vocals, keyboards (2005–present) 
 Session studio musicians
 Asgeir Mickelson – drums (2006, 2008, 2010)
 Tobias Ørnes Andersen	– drums (2012, 2013, 2016, 2018)
 Lars K. Norberg – bass guitar (2008, 2010)
 Jørgen Munkeby - saxophone (2010, 2012, 2016)

 Live musicians (flexible lineup)
Tobias Ørnes Andersen – drums (2010–present)
Tobias Solbakk - drums (2018-present)
Øystein Landsverk – guitars, backing vocals (2010–present)
Eirik Kråkenes – guitars, backing vocals (2018–present)
Nicolay Tangen Svennæs - keyboards, backing vocals (2015–present)
Øystein Heide Aadland - keyboards, backing vocals (2016–present)
Robin Ognedal - guitar (2015–2017)
Tor Oddmund Suhrke – guitars, backing vocals (2010–2014) 
Einar Solberg – keyboards, backing vocals (2010–2014) 
Martin Skrebergene – bass guitar (2013–2014) 
Baard Kolstad – drums (2013–2014)
Rein T. Blomquist – bass guitar (2011–2013)
Halvor Strand – bass guitar (2009–2011)

Discography

Studio albums

EPs
 Telemark (2020)
 Pharos (2020)

Emperor

Peccatum 

 Strangling from Within – (1999)
 Oh, My Regrets (EP) – (2000)
 Amor Fati – (2000)
 Lost in Reverie – (2004)
 The Moribund People (EP) – (2005)

Guest appearances and session contributions

References

External links

 Official website
 Mnemosyne Productions (production label)

1975 births
Living people
Norwegian heavy metal bass guitarists
Norwegian male bass guitarists
Heavy metal keyboardists
Norwegian music educators
Norwegian black metal musicians
Norwegian educators
Norwegian heavy metal guitarists
Norwegian heavy metal singers
Norwegian male singers
Norwegian rock bass guitarists
Norwegian rock guitarists
Norwegian rock keyboardists
Norwegian rock singers
Norwegian Satanists
Norwegian multi-instrumentalists
People from Telemark
Musicians from Notodden
Black metal singers
Progressive metal guitarists
Seven-string guitarists
Eight-string guitarists
Peccatum members
Emperor (band) members
21st-century Norwegian bass guitarists
Candlelight Records artists